Canadian Forces Station Frobisher Bay was a military high-frequency direction-finding station located on Baffin Island at what is now Iqaluit, Nunavut.

See also
 CFS Alert
 Nanisivik Naval Facility

References

External links
Station designator

Canadian Forces bases in Nunavut
Signals intelligence
Frobisher Bay